Onzelievehereboom was the name of a 1200-year-old oak tree in Kortessem, Belgium, dedicated by popular piety to Onze Lieve Here, "Our Dear Lord". It was believed to be the oldest tree in Belgium when it was overthrown by a storm 18 July 2009.

External links

Individual oak trees
2000s individual tree deaths
Individual trees in Belgium
History of Belgian Limburg